Little Feller II and Little Feller I were code names for a set of nuclear tests undertaken by the United States at the Nevada Test Site on July 7 and 17, 1962 as part of Operation Sunbeam. They were both tests of stockpiled W54 warheads, the smallest nuclear warheads known to have been produced by the United States, used in both the Davy Crockett warhead and the Special Atomic Demolition Munition.

This test was performed in conjunction with Operation Ivy Flats, a simulated military environment, and was observed by Attorney General Robert F. Kennedy and presidential adviser General Maxwell D. Taylor.

Little Feller I was the last near-ground atmospheric nuclear detonation conducted by the United States (the high altitude 
Fishbowl tests concluded in November 1962 with a detonation at around  altitude).

All further tests were conducted underground, in accordance with the Partial Test Ban Treaty. An additional footnote is Operation Roller Coaster. Although this later series of tests involved no true nuclear detonation, they did disperse radioactive material using conventional explosives and thus may alternatively be considered the last aboveground nuclear test.

References

External links
"The Davy Crockett" from the Brookings Institution
 Video of the M-388 Davy Crockett Nuclear Test
Operation Ivy Flats government film (1962)

Nevada Test Site nuclear explosive tests
1962 in Nevada
July 1962 events in the United States